Supiori Regency is a regency in the Indonesian province of Papua. The Regency has an area of 634.24 km2 including the Aruri Islands group to the south, and had a population of 15,874 at the 2010 Census and 22,547 at the 2020 Census. Until 8 January 2004, this area was part of the Biak Numfor Regency, from which it was split off in accordance with the Law (Undang-Undang RI No.35 Tahun 2003) dated 18 December 2003.

Geography
It comprises mainly the island of Supiori, one of the Schouten Islands within Cenderawasih Bay off the north coast of Papua province (the rest of the Schouten Islands comprise the separate Biak Numfor Regency); the island is connected to Biak Island by a bridge. The Supiori Regency also includes the Aruri Islands to the south of Supiori, comprising the small coral islands Aruri (Insumbabi) and Rani Island as well as over a hundred smaller islets. Its West Supiori District also includes Mapia Atoll to the northwest, approximately 290 kilometers north of the city of Manokwari.

Administrative Districts
The existing regency comprises five districts (kecamatan), tabulated below with their areas and their populations at the 2010 Census and the 2020 Census. The table also includes the administrative centre of each district, the number of administrative villages (desa and kelurahan) and minor islands within each district, and its post code.

Notes: (a) includes the southwestern portion of Supiori Island, as well as the 111 minor islands. (b) the offshore islands of Pulau Ayami and Pulau Miosfuar.

Climate
Sorendiweri, the seat of the regency has a tropical rainforest climate (Af) with heavy rainfall year-round.

References

External links
Statistics publications from Statistics Indonesia (BPS)

Regencies of Papua (province)
Schouten Islands